Eduardo 'Edu' Alonso Álvarez (born 30 May 1974) is a Spanish retired footballer who played as a right midfielder.

He spent the better part of his career with Alavés after starting out at Athletic Bilbao, playing 180 competitive matches for the former club. Overall, he made more than 200 appearances in both La Liga and Segunda División.

Club career
Born in Bilbao, Basque Country, Alonso was formed at Athletic Bilbao. He spent four full seasons in Segunda División with their B team, making his debut at the age of 18 in a 4–0 home win against SD Eibar where he came on as a second-half substitute.

Alonso was loaned to precisely Eibar for the 1996–97 campaign, being recalled by his parent club shortly after. He first appeared in La Liga on 17 November 1996, starting in a 4–2 away victory over Sporting de Gijón.

After two years at UD Salamanca also in the top tier – where he notably scored a goal for the hosts in a 2–1 home defeat of Athletic and another in a 1–1 draw with FC Barcelona at the Camp Nou the previous weekend– Alonso returned to San Mamés. He played 26 games in all competitions during the season, under manager Luis Fernández.

Following his release, Alonso represented fellow league sides UD Las Palmas and Deportivo Alavés, signing for the latter as a free agent after leaving the Canary Islands due to unpaid wages. He made his debut in the UEFA Cup on 31 October 2002 in a 1–1 home draw against Beşiktaş J.K. for the second round, going on to be relegated twice during his spell.

In September 2008, after recurring injury problems, 34-year-old Alonso parted ways with Alavés by mutual consent and announced his retirement.

International career
Alonso earned two caps for the Spanish under-21s. Additionally, he represented the Basque Country regional team.

References

External links

1974 births
Living people
Spanish footballers
Footballers from Bilbao
Association football midfielders
La Liga players
Segunda División players
Bilbao Athletic footballers
Athletic Bilbao footballers
SD Eibar footballers
UD Salamanca players
UD Las Palmas players
Deportivo Alavés players
Spain under-21 international footballers
Basque Country international footballers